"W-B-X (W-Boiled Extreme)" (stylized as "W-B-X ～W-Boiled Extreme～") is the eleventh single by Japanese singer-songwriter Aya Kamiki and the first as a collaboration with TAKUYA, former guitarist of the Judy and Mary, as . The song is Kamiki's first release under the Avex Trax label and is used as the opening theme for Kamen Rider W. It is also a single from her first album released under Avex titled Individual Emotion.

Summary 
In its first day of release, the single sold 7000 copies and reached #8 on the Oricon daily charts. It also became the #1 theme song downloaded as a ringtone for the week of November 25 to December 1. The single has sold 54,176 copies during 27 weeks and has been downloaded more than 100,000 times (Gold) on mobile.

Music Staff 
 Words: 
 Music: 
 Arrange: TAKUYA & Shuhei Naruse
 Guitar: TAKUYA
 Bass: Toshiyanof the 3rd
 Drums: Masaki

Track list

Notes

References

External links
Kamen Rider Double  at Avex Group
Aya Kamiki's discography at Avex Trax
Rider Sound at Avex Group

2009 singles
2009 songs
Avex Trax singles
Aya Kamiki songs
Japanese television drama theme songs
Kamen Rider